Alexander Baba (born 6 July 1970) is a Ghanaian former professional boxer who competed from 1993 to 2009, winning the African flyweight title in 1995 and challenging for the WBC flyweight title in 2001. As an amateur, he competed in the men's flyweight event at the 1992 Summer Olympics.

References

External links
 

1970 births
Living people
Ghanaian male boxers
Olympic boxers of Ghana
Boxers at the 1992 Summer Olympics
Commonwealth Games competitors for Ghana
Boxers at the 1990 Commonwealth Games
Boxers from Accra
Flyweight boxers
African Boxing Union champions